The 1919 Brown Bears football team represented Brown University as an independent during the 1919 college football season. Led by 18th-year head coach Edward N. Robinson, Brown compiled a record of 5–4–1.

Schedule

References

Brown
Brown Bears football seasons
Brown Bears football